Mohabbat Khawab Safar (lit: Love, Dream, Journey), is a Pakistani drama serial based on the novel of same name by Rukhsana Nigar. It aired every Monday and Tuesday at 9:10pm PST on Hum TV from 24 April 2017 to 29 August 2017 by replacing Kuch Na Kaho. It stars Rabab Hashim, Sehra Afzal, Mirza Zain Baig, Babar Khan, Mehmood Aslam

Cast 
 Rabab Hashim as Zareen/Neelam 
  Mirza Zain Baig as Ali
 Seher Afzal as Sara
 Babar Khan as Ahsan
 Mehmood Aslam as Agha Fayyaz "Faizee"
 Faiq Khan as Mustafa
 Najiba Faiz as Rakhshunda
 Sangeeta as Dadi
 Ambar Wajid as Shaheen
 Mohsin Gillani as Azhar
 Munazzah Arif as Najma
 Hina Javed as Yasmeen
 Nasrullah Khan as Karim
 Kinza Malik as Mustafa's mother
 Azra Mohyeddin as Roshan Begum (Guest appearance)
 Taifoor Khan as Jehangir (Guest appearance)
 Mubashira Khanum as Jehangir's mother
 Fatima Shah Jillani as Laiba Aali
 Yasir Alam as Tanzeel
Ezza Alam?

See also 
 List of programs broadcast by Hum TV
 2017 in Pakistani television

References

External links 
 Official Website
 MD Productions

Pakistani television dramas based on novels
2017 Pakistani television series debuts
Pakistani drama television series
Urdu-language television shows
Hum TV original programming